Skirina or at times al-Skirina is a subject of Baladiyah al-Batha and a residential neighborhood in southern Riyadh, Saudi Arabia. Bordered by Mi'kal neighborhood to the north and Manfuhah al-Jadidah to the south, it is one of the oldest neighborhoods of the city.

References 

Neighbourhoods in Riyadh